Shadow of the Hawk is a 1976 American-Canadian horror film directed by George McCowan and written by Norman Thaddeus Vane and Herbert Wright. The film stars Jan-Michael Vincent, Marilyn Hassett, Chief Dan George, Pia Shandel, Marianne Jones and Jacques Hubert. The film was released on July 14, 1976, by Columbia Pictures. The film was shot on location in British Columbia Canada using West Vancouver, Vancouver and the Lynn Canyon Suspension Bridge as backdrops throughout.

Plot

An old Native American Shaman trains his skeptical grandson to take over for him as the new tribal “Medicine Man” of his small village.  Along the way, they battle the Shaman’s enemies, and their black magic.

Cast
Jan-Michael Vincent as Mike
Marilyn Hassett as Maureen
Chief Dan George as Old Man Hawk
Pia Shandel as Faye
Marianne Jones as Dsonoqua
Jacques Hubert as Andak
Cindi Griffith as Secretary
Anna Hagan as Desk Nurse
Murray Lowry as Intern

Release

Home media
The film was released for the first time on DVD by Sony Pictures Home Entertainment on November 1, 2011. It was scheduled to be released on Blu-ray by Mill Creek Entertainment on October 2, 2018 as a double feature alongside Nightwing.

Reception

Critical response for Shadow of the Hawk has been mostly negative.
Roger Ebert gave the film two out of four stars, criticizing the film's screenplay, and dialogue. Time Out London panned the film, calling it "A tired, TV-style chase movie", and stated that the film's only point of interest was Dan George's performance.

Alternately, Kurt Dahlke of DVD Talk gave the film a more positive review, commending the film's imagery, and special effects, while also noting the occasional "static pacing", and what he called "dueling-eye-closeups".

The film was the third-highest-grossing English language Canadian film of all-time in Canada with a gross of $1.5 million.

References

External links
 
 
 
 

1976 films
1976 horror films
American supernatural horror films
English-language Canadian films
Canadian supernatural horror films
Columbia Pictures films
Films produced by John Kemeny
Films directed by George McCowan
1970s English-language films
1970s American films
1970s Canadian films